USS Aeolus (ARC-3) began service as , an  built by the Walsh-Kaiser Co., Inc. of Providence, Rhode Island. In 1954 she was converted into a cable repair ship to support Project Caesar, the unclassified name for installation of the Sound Surveillance System SOSUS. Aeolus was the first of two ships, the other being USS Thor (ARC-4), to be converted into cable ships. Aeolus performed cable duties for nearly thirty years, from 1955 to 1973 as a commissioned ship and from 1973 until 1985 as the civilian crewed USNS Aeolus (T-ARC-3) of the Military Sealift Command (MSC). The ship was retired in 1985 and sunk as an artificial reef in 1988.

USS Turandot (AKA-47) 

USS Turandot was decommissioned on 21 March 1946, struck from the Navy list on 17 April 1947, and placed in the reserve fleet on 25 June.

USS Aeolus (ARC-3)
On 4 November 1954 the ship was removed from the reserve fleet for conversion to a cable repair ship. The conversion was performed at the Key Highway yard of the Bethlehem Steel Co. in Baltimore, Maryland. The ship was renamed Aeolus, designated ARC-3, on 17 March 1955 and commissioned on 14 May 1955. The Navy crew consisted of nine officers and 196 enlisted personnel with civilian cable or survey personnel as required.

Function 
Aeolus was converted to support the installation of the Sound Surveillance System and other defense cable projects. The system and name were at the time classified with the unclassified name Project Caesar being given to the installation and support of the system. The ship was principally used to transport, deploy, retrieve and repair cables and to conduct acoustic, hydrographic, and bathymetric surveys under Project Caesar. Civilian specialist are involved during cable or surveying operations for the technical work.

Cable being laid was under constant test by civilian experts in the ships cable test room. Cable ships with bow sheaves only required towing astern for some long runs of cable resulting in the unusual feature of two sets of running lights suitable for the stern becoming the effective bow.

By the late 1970s the two Artemis class transports converted to cable ships were in need of modernization or replacement. Some shortcomings in design worked against modernization even though two other ships of the same age were slated for major modernization. Both of those ships, built the same year and as old, were essentially rebuilt to extend their service life but the two larger ships were not going to be modernized. The shallow draft, which also hindered bathymetric survey work due to shallow transducer depth, and large sail area of the exposed hull and superstructure made stopped or very low speed cable operations hazardous. Thrusters could not be built into the shallow draft hulls and tugs had to be used for some operations. The ships had no stern cable capability and could not effectively be modernized for that capability. Finally, the ships could not carry a full load of cable and a full load of fuel without exceeding maximum draft limits and modernization would only add to that limitation by adding weight.

Service history

Aeolus worked in the Atlantic and Caribbean during 1955–56; in the Pacific during 1956–59; and returned to the Atlantic and Caribbean during 1959–62. During 1962–73 she worked principally in the Atlantic, with occasional temporary assignments to the Pacific.

In early 1973 the ship underwent a ten-month refit at the Boston Naval Shipyard in anticipation of transfer to the Military Sealift Command (MSC) later that year. new, up to date, cable machinery along with ship's service generators and auxiliary equipment was installed. The distilling plant was replaced by a new, larger capacity, system. The engineering plant and boilers were overhauled. Changes to both ship's work and habitable spaces addressed work and habitability issues.

On 23 November 1969 the ship began recovering the SNAP-7E nuclear power source off Bermuda. SNAP-7E had failed prematurely and the AEC had requested recovery for examination to identify the failure. Aeolus, on the third pass over the line connecting the lighter anchor to the device, began retrieval. The device was checked for radiation leaks before being secured on board for transport to a facility in Rhode Island.

After returning from European waters on 21 September 1973 the ship was prepared for decommissioning and turn over to the MSC. On 1 October 1973 Aeolus was transferred to MSC operating with a civilian crew as USNS Aeolus (T-ARC-3) until May 1985 when deactivated for lay up in the Maritime Administration's National Defense Reserve Fleet in the James River near Ft. Eustis, Virginia.

During her career, Aeolus received three Meritorious Unit Commendations (in 1970, 1971, and 1973).

Artificial reef
On 28 January 1987 the ship was transferred to the State of North Carolina for sinking as an artificial reef. The ship was intact lying on its starboard side until Hurricane Fran in 1996 when the wreck was shifted and broken into three major pieces with scattered wreckage.

Footnotes

See also
SOSUS

References 

 The Ships and Aircraft of the U.S. Fleet, Norman Polmar, Naval Institute Press, 13th edition, 1984.
 OPNAV NOTICE 1650, Master List of Unit Awards and Campaign Medals, 9 Mar 2001.

External links
 CAESAR Fleet (Photos: IUSS/CAESAR Alumni Association)
 USS Aeolus Association)
 NavSource Online: AKA-47 Turandot, ARC-3 Aeolus
 Notes for Divers Exploring the Sunken Aeolus 

 

Ships built in Providence, Rhode Island
1945 ships
Aeolus-class cable repair ships
Cold War auxiliary ships of the United States
Ships sunk as artificial reefs
Maritime incidents in 1988
Shipwrecks of the Carolina coast